This is a list of original television programming currently and formerly broadcast by DD National.

Currently broadcasts

Original series

Aardhana
Aarogya Yog
Anudamini
Bin Bitiya Aangan Suna
Chitrahaar
Just Junior
Gauri Tera Gaon Bada Pyaraa
Humnawaaz
Jai Mata Kii
Kyunki Jeena Issi ka Naam hai
Lakhiren Kismat Kii
Laut ke aye mere Meet
Mangalsutra - Ek Maryada
Meri Desh Ki Beti
Nargis
Netri: Malhila Sansad aur unki Kahaniya
Pehchan Astitva ki Talash
Pinky
Pratishodh
Ramcharitmanas
Rangoli Vividh Bharti Ke Sath
Ready hai Rampura
Sanskar
Shama
Shillong Holiday Home
Sukanya Hamari Betiyan
U Turn: Zindagi ki Aor
Vande Mataram
Yog Vigyan
Zindagi Ek Bhanwar
Zindagi Kaisi Ek Paheli
 Swaraj: Bharat Ke Swatantrata Sangram ki Samagra Gatha

Acquired series
Baal Krishna
Porus
Shree Ganesh

Formerly broadcasts

Animated series
Bongo
Chhota Bheem
Ghayab Aya
Vartmaan

Hindi dubbed shows

101 Dalmatians: The Series
Aladdin
Arabian Nights: Sinbad's Adventures
Alice In Wonderland
Chamatkari Telephone
Codename: Kids Next Door
Denver, the Last Dinosaur (Danu Danasur)
DuckTales
The Flintstones
Guchche (Stories from My Childhood)
The Jungle Book
The Legend of Tarzan
Lok Gatha
Meena
Mickey Mouse and Friends
Nandu Apna (Kattile Kannan)
Spider-Man
TaleSpin
Timon & Pumbaa
Tom and Jerry

Children's/teen series

Aadha Full
Aaryamaan - Brahmaand Ka Yoddha
Brahmand
Chaat Pani
Chand Sitare
Chandamama
Ek Do Teen Char
Faster Fene
Haddi Raja
Galli Galli Sim Sim
Junior G
DD National Kidz Island
M.A.D.
Neev
Potli Baba Ki
Shaka Laka Boom Boom
Shaktimaan 
School Days
The Stone Boy
Tarang
Yahan Ke Hum Sikandar

Hindi dubbed shows

Bananas in Pyjamas
Giggle and Hoot

Comedy series

Aashiq Biwi Ka
Aisa Bhi Hota Hai
Appu Aur Pappu
Bajega Band Baaja 
Bunty Bubbly Ki Mummy
Colgate Top 10
Daane Anaar Ke
Daftarnama
Dekh Bhai Dekh
Flop Show
Full Tension
Hari Mirchi Lal Mirchi
Idhar Udhar 
Kabhi Saas Kabhi Bahu
Phatichar
Mr. Funtoosh
Mr Ya Mrs
Phir Bhi Dil Hai Hindustani
Shrimaan Shrimati 
Sohni Mahiwal
Truck Dhina Dhin
Tu Tota Main Maina
Ulta Pulta
Wagle Ki Duniya
Yeh Jo Hai Zindagi
Zabaan Sambhalke

Hindi dubbed shows
Didi's Comedy Show
Diff'rent Strokes
Here's Lucy
Yes Minister

Drama series

1857 Kranti
Aa Bael Mujhe Maar
Aahuti
Aaina
Aakhri Daao
Aankhen
Aap Beeti
Aarohan
Abhimaan
Ados Pados
Agneepath - Hai Yehi Zindagi
Air Hostess
Akbar The Great
Akhand Saubhagyawati Bhava
Albeli Kahaani Pyaar Ki
Alif Laila
Amrapali
Amravati Ki Kathayein
Amir Khusro
Anudamini
Anveshan
Aparajita
Apradhi Kaun
Apne Aap
Ardhangini
Aur Bhi Gham Hain Zamane Mein
Aurat
Bahadur Shah Zafar
Bano Begum
Barrister Roy
Bas Thode Se Anjane
Bharat Ek Khoj
Betaal Pachisi
Bharatiya Natya Sastra
Bhootnath
Bible Ki Kahaniya
Buddha
Buniyaad
Bul Bul Bagh
Byomkesh Bakshi 
Captain Vyom 
Chanakya 
Chandrakanta 
Chandramukhi
Chapte Chapte
Charitraheen
Chekhov Ki Duniya
Chhatrapati Shivaji
Chhoti Badi Baatein
Chhote Babu
Chunauti 
Chunni
Chupaun Kaise Laga Chunri Mein Daag
Circus
Dada Dadi Ki Kahaniyan
Darpan
Dastaan-e-Hatimtai
Dastoor
Dayasagar
Deewar
Dil Dariya
Dil Apna Preet Parayee
Dard Ka Rishta
Dishayen
Doosra Keval  
Ehsaas
Ek Din Achanak
Ek Kahaani
Ek Kahani Aur Mili
Ek Prem Katha
Ek Se Badh Kar Ek
Ek Tha Rusty
Farmaan
Fauji
Faujji...The Iron Man
Gayatri Mantra
Geetanjali
Geeta Rahasya
Ghutan
The Great Experiment
The Great Maratha
Grihdaah
Gora
Guldasta
Gul Gulshan Gulfaam 
Gul Sanobar
Habba Khatoon
Hamare Gaurav
Hello Bombay
Hello Inspector
Humsafar:The Train 
Hello Zindagi
Himalaya Darshan
Honee Anhonee
Hum Hindustani
Hum Log
Hum Honge Kamyab
Humrahi
Idiot
Imtihaan
Indradhanush
Intezaar
Intezaar Aur Sahi
IPS Diaries
Isi Bahane
Itihaas
Jaan-e-Alam
Jap Tap Vrat
Jai Hanuman
Jai Mata Ki
Jai Ganga Maiya
Jai Mahalaxmi
Jannat
Jantar Mantar
Janki Jasoos
Jasoos Vijay
Jeevan Ek Rang Anek
Jeevan ke Rang
Jhansi Ki Rani
Jo Kahunga Sach Kahunga
Junoon 
Kaanch Ke Rishte
Kab Tak Pukaru
Kab Tak Pukaroon
Kabeer
Kabhi Door Kabhi Paas
Kacchi Dhoop
Kahan Gaye Woh Log
Kahani Saat Pheron Ki
Kahani Shahjahanabad Ki
Kahkashan
Kakaji Kahin
Kal Hamara Hai
Kalpana
Kamrup Ki Kahani
Kanoon
Karamchand
Karam Yudh
Kasak
Kashish
Kashmakash Zindagi Ki
Katha Sagar
Katha Sarita
Kati Patang Hai Life Yaaron
Kayaamat
Khandaan
Khwabon Ke Darmiyan
Khushiyan
Kirdaar
Kissa Kathmandu Ka
Kisi Ki Nazarr Na Lage
Koi To Ho Ardhnarishwar
Kile Ka Rahasya
Krantijyoti Savitribai Phule
Kshitij Ye Nahi
Kuch Reh Jeewiyal Pall
Kuntee
Lekin Wah Sach Tha
Ladoo Singh Taxiwala
Lady Inspector: Thrills and spills
Lal Kothi Alvida
Lifeline
Lohit Kinare
London Ki Ek Raat
Luv Kush 
Maan 
Mahabharat 
Mahabharat Katha
Maharaja Ranjit Singh
Maharana Pratap
Maharathi Karna
Maila Aanchal
Main Dilli Hoon
Malgudi Days
Mashaal
Maulana Abul Kalam Azad
Mirch Masala
Meera
Meher
Milestone Stories
Mirza Ghalib
Miss India
Mitti Ke Rang
Munshi Premchand's Guldasta
Munshi Premchand ki Kahani
Miya Khoji Ke Karnamey
A Mouthful of Sky
Mr. Yogi
Mrignayani
Mrinal Sen's Stories
Mrityunjay
Morarji
Mujrim Hazir
Mulla Nasiruddin
Mumkin
Mungerilal Ke Haseen Sapne
Muskurahat
Nanhi Si Kali Meri Ladli
Nargis
Natkhad Narad
Neem Ka Ped
Nirmala
Noopur
Noorjahan
Nukkad
Om Namah Shivay
Pachpan Khambein Lal Deewarein
Paltan
Panaah
Panchtantra
Param Vir Chakra
Parsai Kahte Hai
Pariksha Guru
Pavitra Bandhan
Paying Guest
Peehar
Pehchaan
Phir Subah Hogi
Phir Wahi Talash
Phool Khile Hain Gulshan Gulshan 
Phoolwanti
Piya Ka Aangan
Police File Se
Poornima
Prahari
Prasad Ki Charchit Kahaniyan
Pratham Pratishruti
Puraskar
Raag Darbari
Raashi Villa
Raghukul Reet Sada Chali Aayi
Raja Aur Rancho
Raju Aur Udantashtari
Raja Ka Baja
Rajani 
Ramayan
Ranbheri
Rani Ketki Ki Kahani
Reporter
Stree Teri Kahani
Saat Vachan Saat Phere
Sabka Malik Ek Hai
Sabse Bade Ladaiya
Samandar
Sammaan Ek Adhikar
Sangursh
Sankat Mochan Hanumaan
Saraswatichandra
Satyajit Ray Presents
Sauda
Sea Hawks
Shakti
Shalini
Shanti
Shershah Suri
Shiv Mahapuran
Shikwah
Shree Brahma Vishnu Mahesh
Shri Krishna 
Shrikant 
Sindhugatha
Singhasan Battisi
Space City Sigma 
Subah
Sunehre Din
Suno Kahani
Suraag - The Clue 
Surabhi
Shama
Surdas
Super Six
Swabhimaan
Swaraj
Swaraj Nama
Tales of Panchtantra
The Sword of Tipu Sultan
Talaash
Thhoda Sa Aasmaan
Jataka Tales
Tamas
Tane Bane
Tehkikaat 
Tehreer Munshi Premchand Ki 
Terah Panne
Tenali Rama
Thumri Ek Parampara
Trayodashi
Tum Dena Saath Mera
Trishna 
Udaan
Ujale Ki Or
Uppanyas
Upanishad Ganga
Upasana
Uttar Katha
Uttar Ramayan
Ved Vyas Ke Pote
Vidroh
Vikram Aur Betaal
Vishnu Puran
Vishwamitra
Vividha
Wah Janaab
Woh Hue Na Hamare
Women of India
Yatra
Yeh Duniyan Gazab Ki
Ye Hawayein
Yeh Zindagi Hai Gulshan
Your Honour
Yug
Yugantar
Zameen Aasman
Zindagi

Hindi dubbed shows

The Adventures of Sherlock Holmes
Alfred Hitchcock Presents
Bodyline
All My Children
Days of Our Lives
Faerie Tale Theatre
Guiding Light
Oshin
Star Trek: The Original Series

Reality/non-scripted programming

Aap Aur Hum
Anmol Ratan
A Tryst with the People of India
Baaje Payal
Bharat ki Chhap
Bharat Ki Shaan: Singing Star
Business Batein
Coke Studio
Ghoomta Aaina
Krishi Darshan
Krazzy Kiya Re
Kalakarz
Laajawab Talent Show
Living on the Edge
Mashoor Mahal
Mirza Ghalib: The Playful Muse
Money Matters
Porus
Phool Khile Hai Gulshan Gulshan
Quiz Time
Rag Rag Mein Ganga
Rangarang
Satyamev Jayate
Sports Ka Superstar
Superhit Muqabla
Stree Shakti
Sur Sagar
Taana Baana
Turning Point
What's The Good Word?
Wheel Smart Shrimati
Zubaan-e-Ishq

Hindi dubbed shows
Telematch

Films

A Monk/Bodhidharma
Aadmi Aur Aurat
Atmajaa
Bhagat Singh
Chatrapati Sivaji
Chhote Bade
Dakini
Damyanti
Ek Pal Ka Sukh
Hindola
Daddy
In Which Annie Gives It Those Ones
Janam 
Mitro Marjani
Sadgati
Sookha
Panch Parmeshwar
Pathrai Aankhon Ke Sapne
Picnic
Prem Daan
Seva Sadan
Somebody Else's Kids
Thoda Sa Roomani Ho Jayen
Titli
Tulsi
Vilvamangal Ki Pratigya

References

DD National
DD National
DD National original programming